Sir Michelangelo Refalo CBE was the chief justice of Malta from 1919 to 1923.

References 

Maltese knights
20th-century Maltese judges
Year of birth missing
Year of death missing